Lin Li (born 15 July 1992) is a Chinese volleyball player. She was part of the China women's national volleyball team that won the gold medal at the 2016 Summer Olympics. At club level, she has played for Fujian Xi Meng Bao. Lin won the 2016 World Grand Prix Best Libero award. In October 2022, Lin Li announced her retirement.

References

1992 births
Living people
Sportspeople from Fuzhou
Chinese women's volleyball players
Olympic gold medalists for China in volleyball
Volleyball players at the 2016 Summer Olympics
2016 Olympic gold medalists for China
Volleyball players from Fujian
Liberos
Asian Games gold medalists for China
Asian Games medalists in volleyball
Medalists at the 2018 Asian Games
Volleyball players at the 2018 Asian Games
21st-century Chinese women